Nashik Road (sometimes referred to as Nasik Road) is a suburb of Nashik that contains the city's railway station. The name 'Nashik Road' was originally used for the town surrounding the station (about 8 km or 5 miles southwest from the heart of Nashik city) and parts of the adjoining Deolali village, but has been administratively merged with the Nashik Municipal Corporation since the year 1984. Nashik Road is one of the fastest growing suburbs of the area, with almost 575,000 residents.

Geography 
Nashik Road is a developing suburb of Nashik. The district has hotels and restaurants. 

Among the district's major residential areas are Dattamandir, Andhashala, Gandharvanagari, Shikhrewadi, Jailroad, Gaykhe Mala, Jai Bhavani Road, and Upanagar. Shirdi, known as the home of Sai Baba, is near Nashik Road.

Infrastructure 
The area is also known for its plethora of hospitals and financial institutions such as Business co-op Bank, The Nashik Road Deolali Vyapari Sahakari Bank Ltd., SBI and the ICICI Bank.

Transport

Road 
The Mumbai-Agra Highway (NH3), Nashik-Pune Highway (NH 50), Peth Road, Wani Road, Bhagur-Nashik Road (Lam road), and Jail Road are among the major roads in the city, alongside residential and commercial neighborhoods. The first road overpass of the city (named 'Swatantryaveer Vinayak Damodar Savarkar flyover') is Nashik Road and goes over the NH 50.

Railway 
Nashik Road railway station was built by Bhagwant Singh Kapoor's local construction company. This railway station is an important stop on the Mumbai-Bhusawal-Delhi and Mumbai-Bhusawal-Nagpur-Kolkata Central Railway routes. Heavy passenger traffic is a daily feature of the sector. In 2017, the government of Maharashtra and the Ministry of Railways unveiled a joint venture to construct a 248-km track to enable train service between Nashik Road and Pune. Similarly, the Rajya Rani Express train started running from Nashik to Mumbai in 2011.

Air 
Nashik Road hosts Nashik Airport (operated in conjunction with the Indian Air Force), offering a 50 minute flight to Mumbai.

Tourism

Muktidham and Bhaktidham is a marble temple complex honouring various Hindu deities. Mhasoba Mandir at Andha sala, also known as Temple of Bell, is a Shri Icchamani Ganesh Temple at the Upnagar area of Nashik Road. The city railway station is located in Nashik Road. The Shrine of the Infant Jesus is located there. This shrine houses an idol of Infant Jesus, which is only found elsewhere in Yugoslavia. 

A fair is held each February to honor the religious idol. Triambakeshwar, one of the most notable holy sites of India, is near Nashik. Triambakeshwar is one of the twelve Jyotirlingas in India. It is sacred for multiple reasons. Godavari river originates from this place. It is a place of Tri-Sandhya Gayatri. It is the birthplace of Lord Ganesha. It is a place of the first Nath of Nath Sampradaya consisting of Gorakhnath and others. Nivrittinath was made to imbibe the holy knowledge by his Guru Gahininath there. Nivrittinath made his brothers and sister attain the self by his preaching there.

Education
Educational institutions include Ryan International School, St. Xaviers High School, St. Philomena's Convent High School, Ashoka Universal School, Purushottam English School, K.N. Kela Progressive, R.J.C. Bytco Girls School, Kothari Kanya Shala, Jairambhai, and K. J. Mehta, Bytco College of Commerce, Science and Arts,M.s Gosavi Polytechnic (Bytco College Campus),S. V. K. T. College (popularly known as Bhatia College & Bytco Campus), Matoshree College of Engineering, and the research center Eklahare Nashik.

Economy

The India Security Press (the National treasury press) was the biggest employer in Nashik Road for many decades, until the late eighties, when the service-based economy started to thrive. The existence of the India Security Press provided employment to thousands of residents and spawned the surrounding economy. It also kept the green canopy in the city protected.  It has an adjoining Gymkhana and a large playground, which is a favorite games/exercise spot for children and adults.

The government began creating IT parks in Nashik Road. Industries include Mahindra & Mahindra, an automobile industry based out of the region. MICO Bosch is located at Satpur. Hindustan Aeronautics Limited is a fighter aircraft manufacturing company in the Ojhar, a mere 20 km from Nashik at east side.

References

Cities and towns in Nashik district
Nashik